Reborn is the ninth release, and sixth album, from the Christian metal band Stryper, and the first full-length album of new material since Against the Law in 1990.  Reborn was slated to be a Michael Sweet solo record, but after their reunion tour, Sweet played it for the other members, at which time Oz Fox suggested it should be a Stryper record. So the other members came in and learned their parts from the original demos. Sweet says in his autobiography, Honestly: My Life and Stryper Revealed, that he convinced Big3 Records, which had signed him for a solo release, to make it a Stryper record deal. Thus, Reborn became the first all-original Stryper record in 15 years.

The sound of the album is more contemporary compared to their previous records. It is also heavier and has influences of nu metal. The sound has been cited as more mature than their previous material, "less glam and more filling", according to one reviewer. This is the first album recorded by the band with new bass guitar player Tracy Ferrie. Reborn was released with a variety of cover art, depending on format and region. The alternate US cover art was created for record outlets (such as Christian bookstores) where the original cover art may have been perceived as too disturbing or offensive.

Track listing
All tracks written by Michael Sweet, except where noted.
"Open Your Eyes" - 4:02
"Reborn" - 3:27
"When Did I See You Cry" (M. Sweet, David Johnson) - 3:35
"Make You Mine" - 4:01
"Passion" - 3:48
"Live Again" - 3:30
"If I Die" - 3:22
"Wait for You" - 3:43
"Rain" (Paul Heusman, M. Sweet) - 3:45
"10,000 Years" (Public domain, M. Sweet) - 3:15
"I.G.W.T." (M. Sweet, Robert Sweet) - 3:17

"I.G.W.T." is a remake of the band's previous song "In God We Trust" from the album of the same name.

Personnel 
Stryper
 Michael Sweet – lead vocals, guitars, arrangements 
 Oz Fox – guitars, backing vocals
 Tracy Ferrie – bass, backing vocals 
 Robert Sweet – drums

Additional musicians
 Kenny Lewis – keyboards, programming, loops 
 Peter Vantine – keyboards, programming, orchestrations
 Lou Spagnola – bass (2, 5, 10)
 Derek Kerswill – drums, drum loops
 Alan Magnus – additional backing vocals

Production 
 Bill Edwards – executive producer 
 Michael Sweet – producer, arrangements, mixing, tracking 
 Kenny Lewis – producer, mixing, tracking, Pro Tools engineer
 Will Sandals – tracking
 Peter Vantine – tracking
 Ted Jensen – mastering 
 Doug Circle – art direction 
 Richie "Britley" Hughes – art direction 
 Stephen Stickler – photography 
 Deep South Entertainment – management 

Studios
 Recorded at Blue Jay Studios (Carlisle, Massachusetts); Mixed Emotions (Middleton, Massachusetts); Vantine Studios (Stoneham, Massachusetts).
 Pro Tools engineering at MSP Studios (Bourne, Massachusetts).
 Mixed at Mixed Emotions
 Mastered at Sterling Sound (New York City, New York).

References

2005 albums
Stryper albums